Marius Helle (born 11 August 1983) is a former Norwegian footballer.

Club career
Marius Helle became top scorer for Ålgård in 2005, creating huge interest from many Norwegian football clubs. Marius Helle had trials with various Norwegian clubs, including Bodø/Glimt, Brann, Bryne and Viking. He ended up signing for Bryne in 2006.

Marius Helle transferred from Bryne to Tippeligaen side Stabæk in August 2010. On 22 August 2010, on his debut for Stabæk, he scored his first goal for the club in the 4-0 away win against Hønefoss.

He later returned to Bryne, but in mid-2012 he signed for Sandnes Ulf. On 31 October 2016 Helle decided to retire after Bryne was relegated.

Career statistics

References

1983 births
Living people
Sportspeople from Rogaland
Sportspeople from Stavanger
Norwegian footballers
Ålgård FK players
Bryne FK players
Stabæk Fotball players
Sandnes Ulf players
Norwegian First Division players
Eliteserien players

Association football forwards